Jerusalem Road 21 is a road beginning at Highway 1 between Ramat Shlomo and Shu'afat northward to Beit Hanina and the Atarot Industrial Park.  Plans call for a boulevard with two lanes in each direction.  Construction is expected to cost NIS 112 million and was originally expected to be completed by January 2015. The first three sections of the road and part of the fourth section were completed in 2020.

Route
Traveling northward, the road includes new entrances to Ramat Shlomo and Shu'afat reaching an altitude of 810 m.

It continues along the western slopes of Shu'afat and Beit Hanina above the valley of the Atarot Stream at an average altitudof 750 m. as far as Jerusalem Road 20. From there the road will proceed northward through north-west Beit Hanina, finally ending at the Atarot Industrial Park.

Rather than through cutting and bridging to cross the many draws along the hillside, the road's alignment follows a curving route while maintaining a relatively stable grade with minimal engineering.

History
Plans for the road were advanced in 2002 when Moriah Jerusalem Development Corporation approved designs and published tenders for its construction.  In 2005, the Israel Ministry af Transport approved financing for more detailed designs and initial clearing and fencing along the route.  In 2010, the Jerusalem Municipality announced its intention to purchase land for that purpose.

When the road was first proposed, the stated official purpose was to provide an alternative to part of the existing north–south route in the area.  Specifically, Shuafat Road suffers traffic congestion during rush hours as a result of the Jerusalem Light Rail which runs along its median.  This will be alleviated by several access points to the new road from the west side of Shuafat and Beit Hanina.

Palestinian groups point to an additional phrase in the stated purpose which says the new road would provide additional access to Ramat Shlomo and future neighborhoods (such as Nof Shmu'el) which are considered illegal settlements by the international community.

Construction began in early 2013 beginning at the southern end at Highway 1 (Yigael Yadin Boulevard).  During the initial stages of clearing, Moriah Corporation unearthed a previously unknown stone quarry and stonecutters tools dating from over 2000 years ago.   According to Irene Zilberbod, excavation director on behalf of the Israel Antiquities Authority, the size and type of cuttings indicated that this particular quarry probably supplied stones for magnificent public buildings.

The first section from Highway 1 to the first traffic circle opened September, 2014.  The second section to the second traffic circle opened November, 2014.  The third section was completed over several more years, first to Helet Sinad and Yekutiel Adam Blvd. and then to Shomaan Street (Road 20). This third section was completed in June, 2020. The fourth section is in various stages of construction as of 2021.

Junctions (south to north)

References

External links

21
21